George Thomas William Davison (born April 1965) is a priest of the Church of Ireland. Since 2020, he has served as the Bishop of Connor.

Early life and education
Davison was born in April 1965, and grew up in south Belfast, Northern Ireland. He was studied theology at the University of St Andrews, graduating with a Bachelor of Divinity (BD) degree in 1988. He then attended Oak Hill College, a conservative evangelical theological college in London, and the Church of Ireland Theological College in Dublin. He graduated from the latter with a Bachelor of Theology (BTh) degree in 1992.

Ordained ministry
He was ordained as a deacon in 1992 and priest in 1993. After a curacy at Portadown he was the incumbent at Kinawley from 1995 to 2009; and Archdeacon of Kilmore from 2003 to 2009. Since 2009 he has been at St. Nicholas, Carrickfergus; and from 2013 Archdeacon of Belfast. 

On 17 February 2020, Davison was elected as the next Bishop of Connor. He was consecrated a bishop on 3 September 2020 at St Patrick's Cathedral, Armagh, during a service conducted under Covid-19 restrictions: the congregation numbered less than thirty. He was consecrated John McDowell, Archbishop of Armagh, and the co-consecrators were Pat Storey and Andrew Forster.

References

1965 births
Living people
Archdeacons of Kilmore
Archdeacons of Belfast
Alumni of the University of St Andrews
Alumni of the Church of Ireland Theological Institute
Evangelical Anglican bishops
People from Belfast
Alumni of Oak Hill College